Thorunna florens is a species of sea slug, a dorid nudibranch, a shell-less marine gastropod mollusk in the family Chromodorididae.

Distribution 
This species was described from Japan. It has been reported from Thailand, Australia and Indonesia but is probably a species complex.

Description

Ecology

References

External links
 

Chromodorididae
Gastropods described in 1984